Edward Plunkett may refer to: 

Edward Plunkett, 4th Baron of Dunsany (died 1521)
Edward Plunkett, 12th Baron of Dunsany (1713–1781), Baron of Dunsany
Edward Plunkett, 14th Baron of Dunsany (1773–1848), Baron of Dunsany
Edward Plunkett, 16th Baron of Dunsany (1808–1889), Baron of Dunsany
Edward Plunkett, 18th Baron of Dunsany (1878–1957)
Edward Plunkett, 20th Baron of Dunsany (1939-2011)